5 High Petergate is a historic building in the city centre of York, in England.

The building originated as a three-storey timber-framed building, constructed in about 1600.  In about 1700, it was rebuilt in brick, retaining three storeys, and also having attics and a cellar.  In the early 19th century, extensions were added at the rear, while in the 20th century, a shopfront was inserted at ground floor level, facing onto Low Petergate.  The building was grade II* listed in 1954.

The brick front is limewashed.  It is topped by a cornice, with a drainpipe head in the centre, dated 1763.  Inside, much early plasterwork survives.  The building's main staircase dates from the early 19th century, while its rear staircase is late 18th century.  The front room on the first floor is panelled, and has pilasters of the Ionic order flanking the fireplace.

References

High Petergate 05
High Petergate 05